Isabelle Chuine is a French ecologist. She is CEFE-CNRS Research Director in Functional and Evolutionary Ecology. Chuine was awarded a 2020 CNRS silver medal for her work.

Life and career 
She is a professor at University Montpellier 2. In 1999, she presented at the 16th Botanical conference. At 2020 Science Day, she gave a lecture. She collected citizens science data, about plant flowering.

Works

References

External links 

French ecologists
Living people
Year of birth missing (living people)
Research directors of the French National Centre for Scientific Research